Talada is a village in eastern India located on the border of the Srikakulam District and Gajapati District of Odisha. Talada has a population of 400-500 people, many of whom are farmers.

References

Villages in Srikakulam district